Sir John Bradford Timmins  (born 1932) is a British businessman, retired reservist, and public servant.

Timmins was born in 1932 and attended Wolverhampton Technical College and the University of Aston in Birmingham. He worked in building and civil engineering until 1980 and has been chairman of Warburton Properties Ltd since 1973.

He was appointed a deputy lieutenant in 1981 and served as High Sheriff of Greater Manchester for the 1986–87-year. He was appointed a magistrate for Trafford in 1987. Timmins then served for twenty years as Lord Lieutenant of Greater Manchester, between 1987 and 2007.In 2002 he was appointed a Knight Commander of the Royal Victorian Order. He has also received honorary doctorates from the University of Salford and the University of Manchester.

Timmins was also active in the Territorial Army between 1956 and 1980; he commanded 75 Engineer Regiment from 1971 to 1973 and was appointed an Officer of the Order of the British Empire that year.

References 

Living people
1932 births
British businesspeople
Lord-Lieutenants of Greater Manchester
Knights Commander of the Royal Victorian Order